Matthias Gu Zheng (born 17 February 1937) is a Chinese Catholic priest and Bishop of the Apostolic Prefecture of Xining since 1991.

References

1937 births
Living people
21st-century Roman Catholic bishops in China
20th-century Roman Catholic bishops in China